The 2002–03 OB I bajnokság season was the 66th season of the OB I bajnokság, the top level of ice hockey in Hungary. Six teams participated in the league, and Alba Volan Szekesfehervar won the championship.

First round

Final round

Playoffs

3rd place 
 Ferencvárosi TC - Miskolci JJE 2:0 (5:2, 9:5)

Final
 Alba Volán Székesfehérvár - Dunaferr SE Dunaújváros 5:0 (6:5, 6:1, 6:5 OT, 3:2, 5:2)

External links
 Season on hockeyarchives.info

OB I bajnoksag seasons
Hun
OB